Martin Villa was a station on the Port Authority of Allegheny County's light rail network, located in Castle Shannon, Pennsylvania. The street level stop was incorporated into the system to serve an apartment complex of the same name. On the opposite side of the street, a variety of residences were within walking distance.

Martin Villa was one of eleven stops closed on June 25, 2012 as part of a system-wide consolidation effort.

History
The stop dated back to the PCC streetcar era, being at the transition between center street and off street reserved right of way.

References

External links 

Port Authority T Stations Listings
Station from Google Maps Street View

Former Port Authority of Allegheny County stations
Railway stations in the United States opened in 1987
Railway stations closed in 2012
Blue Line (Pittsburgh)
Red Line (Pittsburgh)